Apodanthera is a genus of plants in the family Cucurbitaceae.

References

Cucurbitaceae genera
Cucurbitoideae